Meier Tzelniker (1 January 1894 – 8 October 1980) was a Yiddish-speaking actor born in Hotin County, Romania. He appeared mainly in Yiddish theatre, but was sometimes a character actor in English-language plays and films, such as It Always Rains On Sunday (1947) and Expresso Bongo (1959).

Biography 
Meier Tzelniker was born in Hotin-Bessarabia, Romania, the son of a yeast manufacturer. Meier was a boy chorister in a synagogue when he got his first stage role in Yiddish theatre, and toured eastern Europe with a Yiddish theatre company.

Selected filmography
 Mr. Emmanuel (1944) - Mr. Silver
 It Always Rains on Sunday (1947) - Solly, his father
 Last Holiday (1950) - Baltin
 Venetian Bird (1952) - Mayor of Mirave
 The Teckman Mystery (1954) - John Rice
 Make Me an Offer (1954) - Wendl
 The Woman for Joe (1955) - Sol Goldstein
 The Extra Day (1956) - Lou Skeat
 Stars in Your Eyes (1956) - Maxie Jago
 The Long Haul (1957) - Nat Fine
 A Night to Remember (1958) - Mr. Isador Straus
 Expresso Bongo (1959) - Mayer
 Jungle Street (1960) - Mr. Rose
 Let's Get Married (1960) - Schutzberger
 A Circle of Deception (1960) - Barman
 His and Hers (1961) - Felix McGregor
 The 25th Hour (1967) - Abramovici
 The Sorcerers (1967) - The Jewish Baker
 The Killing of Sister George (1968) - Mr. Katz

References

External links
 

1894 births
1980 deaths
British male film actors
British male stage actors
Jewish British male actors
20th-century British male actors
Yiddish theatre performers